Greatest Hits Volume III is a compilation album released by Barry Manilow in 1989 on Arista Records. It was the third of a three-album series released that year, along with Volume I and Volume II.

Track listing

All track information and credits were taken from the CD liner notes.

References

1989 greatest hits albums
Barry Manilow compilation albums
Arista Records compilation albums